Breznička is a village and municipality in the Poltár District in the Banská Bystrica Region of Slovakia.

History
In historical records the village was first mentioned in 1279 (Berzenche) as a Slavic settlement.

See also
 List of municipalities and towns in Slovakia

References

Genealogical resources

The records for genealogical research are available at the state archive "Statny Archiv in Banska Bystrica, Slovakia"

 Roman Catholic church records (births/marriages/deaths): 1776-1905 (parish A)
 Lutheran church records (births/marriages/deaths): 1734-1897 (parish B)

External links
 
 
https://web.archive.org/web/20070513023228/http://www.statistics.sk/mosmis/eng/run.html
https://web.archive.org/web/20070609223738/http://www.breznicka.ocu.sk/
http://www.e-obce.sk/obec/breznicka/breznicka.html
Surnames of living people in Breznicka

Villages and municipalities in Poltár District